is a passenger railway station located in the city of Kitamoto, Saitama Prefecture, Japan, operated by East Japan Railway Company (JR East) .

Lines
Kitamoto Station is served by the Takasaki Line, with through Shōnan-Shinjuku Line and Ueno-Tokyo Line services to and from the Tōkaidō Line.

Station layout
The station has one side platform and one island platform serving three tracks, connected by a footbridge, with an elevated station building located above the platforms. The station has a "Midori no Madoguchi" staffed ticket office.

Platforms

History 
It was renamed to its present name on 21 March 1961. The station became part of the JR East network after the privatization of the JNR on 1 April 1987.

Passenger statistics
In fiscal 2019, the station was used by an average of 18,491 passengers daily (boarding passengers only).

Surrounding area
Kitammoto City Hall
Kitamoto Post Office

See also
List of railway stations in Japan

References

External links

JR East Kitamoto Station

Railway stations in Japan opened in 1928
Railway stations in Saitama Prefecture
Takasaki Line
Shōnan-Shinjuku Line
Kitamoto, Saitama